Streptomyces inusitatus is a bacterium species from the genus of Streptomyces which has been isolated from soil. Streptomyces inusitatus produces oxamycetin.

See also 
 List of Streptomyces species

References

Further reading

External links
Type strain of Streptomyces inusitatus at BacDive -  the Bacterial Diversity Metadatabase

inusitatus
Bacteria described in 1978